Pandora is a fictional character created by William A. Christensen, Editor-in-Chief of Avatar Press comics.

Background
From Avatar Press' site:

Pandora comics
 Pandora #0–2
 Pandora Special
 Pandora: Demonography (drawn by Mike Wolfer, oneshot)
 Pandora: Devil's Advocate
 Pandora: Nudes
 Pandora: Pandemonium
 Pandora Pinup
 Pandora's Chest
 Pandora: Love and War TPB (collection of Pandora stories from Threshold)

Crossovers:
 Pandora/Razor
 Pandora/Shotgun Mary
 Pandora/Widow (written by Mark Seifert, drawn by Mike Wolfer, oneshot)
 Pandora/Widow: Arachnephobia
 Avengelyne/Pandora #1
 Hellina vs Pandora #1–3
 Lady Death: Lost Souls #0–2 (crossover between Lady Death, War Angel, Pandora, and Unholy)
 Lady Death vs Pandora #1
 Threshold #54 & Pandora Annual #1 ("Plague")
 Shi: Pandora's Box

Pandora has also appeared in many issues of Threshold, Avatar Press' anthology comic.

References

External links
 Pandora subpage

Comics characters introduced in 1996
Avatar Press titles
Fictional goddesses
Fictional bisexual females
Female characters in comics